Shabayev or Shabaev is a Tatar masculine surname, its feminine counterpart is Shabayeva or Shabaeva. It may refer to
Ildar Shabayev (born 1985), Russian football player
Ilshat Shabaev, Russian dancer, singer and choreographer
Irina Shabayeva, American fashion designer
Yevgeny Shabayev (1973–1998), Russian artistic gymnast

Tatar-language surnames